The Black Sea Biosphere Reserve is a biosphere reserve of Ukraine that is located at littoral zone of the northern Black Sea coast covering regions of the Kherson and Mykolaiv Oblasts and including Gulf of Tendra and Yahorlyk Bay. The reserve is part of the National Academy of Sciences of Ukraine.

History
The preserve was initially established on July 14, 1927, as part of the Trans-Maritime Preserve by the decree No. 172 of the Council of People's Commissars of Ukrainian SSR. In 1933, the preserve became an independent research institution. In 1973 to the Black Sea Preserve were added the Danube floodplains, Kinski islands in Yahorlyk Bay, and the shallow portion of the Gulf of Tendra. Next year, the neighboring Yahorlyk reserve was annexed as well. In 1981, the Danube floodplains became an independent preserve. In 1983, there was established the Black Sea Biosphere Reserve that included the Black Sea State Preserve and the Yahorlyk State Ornithological Reserve (as its buffer zone). In December 1984, the reserve was accepted to the World Network of Biosphere Reserves. The territory of the preserve is included in the International list of Ramsar Convention.

The preserve was damaged in March 2022 during the Russian invasion of Ukraine, when ongoing fighting caused several fires in the area.

Fauna 
The fauna of the reserve includes about 3500 species. Among them are the most diverse insects, of which about 2200 species are known here, arachnids — 168 species, and mollusks — 65 species. Vertebrates are represented by 462 species, including a wide variety of birds — 304 species have been recorded. The reptile fauna comprises 9 species and is one of the most diverse among Ukrainian reserves. For all the years of observations in the marine waters of the reserve, 83 species of fish, or about 50% of the species composition of the Black Sea fish fauna, have been found. The terrestrial mammalian fauna includes 50 species, and the marine fauna — 3 species.

See also 
 List of Nature Reserves of Ukraine
 Environmental impact of the 2022 Russian invasion of Ukraine

References

External links
 Black Sea Biosphere Reserve (Essay)
 Brief description
 Overview
 Brief description at site of the biosphere reserves of Ukraine
 Company description
 Presidential decree to expand the territory of the preserve
 Overview at ukrainaincognita.com

Geography of Kherson Oblast
Geography of Mykolaiv Oblast
Biosphere reserves of Ukraine
Wetlands of Ukraine
Tourist attractions in Kherson Oblast
Tourist attractions in Mykolaiv Oblast
NASU department of general biology
National Academy of Sciences of Ukraine